Antonina Mykhailivna Kravchuk (née Mishura (Мішура); November 3, 1935 in the village of Vyry Bilopillia Raion, Sumy Oblast, Ukraine SSR) is a former First Lady of Ukraine.

Biography
Antonina Mykhailivna Mishura was born in the village of Vyry Bilopillia Raion, Sumy Oblast, Ukraine SSR on November 3, 1935. In 1958, she graduated from the Faculty of Economics of Taras Shevchenko National University of Kyiv. PhD in Economics.

She worked as an associate professor of the economic faculty of the Taras Shevchenko National University of Kyiv. She was the founder of the magazine "Personnel", the All-Ukrainian general political educational weekly "Personnel Plus" at the Joint-Stock Company Interregional Academy of Personnel Management (MAUP).

Since 1957, she had been married to Leonid Kravchuk. She rarely attended official events with her husband.

Antonina Mishura has one child, Oleksandr Leonidovych Kravchuk (born 1959), president of the State Company "Nafkom-Ahro" and the former FC Nafkom Brovary. Kravchuk has two grandchildren and one great-granddaughter. Although Kravchuk does not work for the Ukrainian state anymore she is still living in a state-owned dacha in Koncha-Zaspa.

References

1935 births
Living people
People from Sumy Oblast
First Ladies of Ukraine
Academic staff of the Taras Shevchenko National University of Kyiv
Leonid Kravchuk
20th-century Ukrainian economists
Ukrainian women economists